Martina Awele Nwakoby (born 1937) is a Nigerian writer.

Early life and education 
She was born in Ogwashi-Uku and was educated in Niger, in Birmingham, at the University of Pittsburgh and at tane University of Ibadan, receiving a PhD in literary studies from the latter institution.

Career 
Martina was described as one of the Nigerian female writers who dare to "challenge the dominant paradigm" in an article preview titled "Nigerian Female Writers: A Critical Perspective" edited by Henrietta C. Otokunefor and Obiageli C. Nwodo in 1989. She was on the list of Nigerian women writers, whose works have been marginally represented in the nation's literary scene Martina was also described as one of the Nigeria females to move "into a journey of relevance; a journey of redemption, strongly suspecting woman is under siege of perpetual domination." This made her a devoted feminists and one of the second-generation writers and critics in Nigeria from the 1970s.

She has lectured at Abia State University.

Achievements 
Nwakoby won the 1978 Macmillan children's book competition. Her most widely held works were "A house divided" which had 3 editions that were published between 1985 and 2002 in English and are held by 37 libraries worldwide and "A lucky chance" which had 4 editions published between 1980 and 1983 in English and held by 18 libraries worldwide.

Works 
 Ten in the Family, children's book (1973) 
 A Lucky Chance, children's book (1980)
 A House Divided, novel (1985)

References 

1937 births
Living people
20th-century Nigerian novelists
Nigerian children's writers
Nigerian women children's writers
Nigerian women novelists
University of Pittsburgh alumni
University of Ibadan alumni
Academic staff of Abia State University
20th-century women writers